Pietro Ungarello di Marco de' Natali, better known as Petrus de Natalibus ( 1400  1406), was an Italian bishop and the author of a collection of lives of the saints.

No details of the early life of this hagiographer have been handed down to us. A Venetian, he consecrated himself to the ecclesiastical state, becoming a canon in Equilio (Jesolo). On 5 July 1370, he was elevated to the episcopal see of that city. Details are also lacking regarding his pastoral activity. The last mention of him refers to the year 1400, and in 1406, another appears as Bishop of Equilio; the date of his decease, therefore, must be set between these two years 

He is chiefly known as the author of Legends of the Saints in twelve books, a work with a wide circulation. In his arrangement of the various lives he follows the calendar of the Church. 

The collection, first printed in Vicenza, 1493, went through many editions, the last of which (the eighth) appeared in Venice, 1616.

Notes

References
Johann Albert Fabricius, Bibliotheca mediae et infimae aetatis, ed. Mansi, V, 93
August Potthast, Bibliotheca historica medii aevi, 2nd ed., II, 918.

External links
Catalogus Sanctorum et gestorum eorum (1543 edition) (Google Books)

Bishops in Veneto
Christian hagiographers
14th-century Italian Roman Catholic bishops
15th-century Italian Roman Catholic bishops
14th-century births
1400s deaths